Han van den Berg (17 February 1925 – 7 December 2015) was a Dutch rower who competed in the 1948 Summer Olympics. He was born in Amsterdam.

References

1925 births
2015 deaths
Dutch male rowers
Olympic rowers of the Netherlands
Rowers at the 1948 Summer Olympics
Rowers from Amsterdam